Michael Wandmacher (born October 29, 1967) is an American composer of music for film, television, and video games. He has worked on numerous well-known projects, including Piranha 3D, Punisher: War Zone, Bloodborne, Twisted Metal, and The Goldbergs. Most recently, he has worked on Underworld: Blood Wars, succeeding previous series composers Paul Haslinger and Marco Beltrami.

Life and career 
Wandmacher was born in Minneapolis. He began his career composing music for local news media and television commercials before scoring short and feature films by local filmmakers. While following a series of email exchanges that started via a film music newsgroup, Wandmacher met Alan Silvestri and was invited to Los Angeles to participate in several scoring sessions. They composed music for the English-language releases of several Jackie Chan films including Armour of God and Drunken Master II. He eventually found success with the black comedy horror film Modern Vampires. Wandmacher co-composed the score with Danny Elfman, the brother of the film's director Richard Elfman. Wandmacher permanently relocated to Los Angeles.

The majority of Wandmacher's work consists of genre films particularly horror and thriller films. In 2015, Wandmacher composed the score to the role-playing video game Bloodborne.

Wandmacher also creates remixes under the pseudonym "Khursor".  As such, he has worked with Godhead including a track on The Shadow Realigned album. The Khursor remix of Sting's Every Breath You Take was featured on the trailer for the third season of The Americans.

Works

Theatrical films

Television films

Television series

Video games

References

External links 

21st-century American composers
Living people
Place of birth missing (living people)
1967 births
Video game composers